Heinrich XXIX, Count of Reuss-Ebersdorf  (born 21 July 1699 in Ebersdorf; died: 22 May 1747 in Herrnhaag) was a member of the House of Reuss Younger Line and Count Ebersdorf from 1711 until his death

Life 
Heinrich was the son of Count Heinrich X Reuss of Ebersdorf and his wife Erdmuthe Benigna of Solms-Laubach.  They raised Heinrich strictly according to the guidelines of the Pietism.  Heinrich soon befriended Count Nicholas Ludwig von Zinzendorf.  He married on 7 September 1721 in Castell with Sophie Theodora (1703–1777), daughter of Count Dietrich Wolfgang of Castell-Remlingen and Countess Dorothea Renata of Zinzendorf (1669-1743).  At Heinrich's wedding, Count Nicholas Ludwig met Heinrich's sister, Erdmuthe Dorothea.  They married exactly one year later.

Under Count Heinrich XXIX, a Moravian Church was founded in Ebersdorf, after the model of the church von Zinzendorf had founded in Upper Lusatia at Herrnhut.  Because class differences were largely eliminated in this church, the whole village met in the ballroom of the palace to pray and sing hymns.  The Count and his servants were to treat each other as "brothers" while in church.

Issue 
Count Heinrich XXIX and Countess Sophie Theodora of Castell-Remlingen had thirteen children:
 Renate Benigna (1722–1747)
 Heinrich XXIV (1724–1779), Count of Reuss-Ebersdorf
 Heinrich XXVI (1725–1796)
 Heinrich XXVIII (30 August 1726 — 10 May 1797), married Agnes Sophie (1720–1791), daughter of Erdmann II of Promnitz
 Sophie Auguste (1728–1753), married 1748, Baron Ludwig von Weitelfshausen
 Charlotte Louise (1729–1792)
 Heinrich XXXI (1731–1763)
 Heinrich XXXII (born: 1733, killed in the Battle of Lobositz on 1 October 1756)
 Heinrich XXXIII (1734–1791)
 Heinrich XXXIV (1737–1806)
 Christiane Eleonore (1739–1761)
 Mary Elizabeth (1740–1784), married in 1765 Heinrich XXV, Count of Reuss-Lobenstein
 Johanna Dorothea (1743–1801) married in 1770 Christoph Friedrich Levin von Trotha

References 
Thomas Gehrlein: "Das Haus Reuss: Älterer und Jüngerer Linie", booklet, August 2006
Stephan Hirzel: Der Graf und die Brüder, Quell Verlag, Stuttgart, 1980, 
Erika Geiger: Nikolaus Ludwig von Zinzendorf. Der Erfinder der Herrnhuter Losungen. Seine Lebensgeschichte,2d ed.,  Hänssler, Holzgerlingen, 2000,  (Biography)

Counts of Reuss
House of Reuss
1699 births
1747 deaths
18th-century German people